Neil Stewart may refer to:

 Neil Stewart (Canadian politician) (1793–1881), merchant and politician in Canada West
 Neil Stewart (British politician), president of the National Union of Students of the United Kingdom

See also